The Ministry of Immigration, Francisation and Integration (French: Ministère de l'Immigration, de la Francisation et de l'Intégration) is a government department in Quebec responsible for immigration, Francisation, and integration in the province. Accordingly, it provides a variety of programs for immigrants and immigrant communities in the province.

Jurisdiction in matters of immigration in Quebec is shared with the Canadian government, in accordance to the Constitution Act of 1867 (article 95) and the 1991 Canada–Québec Accord relating to Immigration and Temporary Admission of Aliens. The federal government pays financial compensation to Quebec in order to ensure the reception and integration of immigrants.

The department was previously known as the Ministry of Immigration, Diversity, and Inclusion (Ministère de l’Immigration, de la Diversité et de l’Inclusion), but received its current title after the CAQ party, a centre-right to right-wing Quebec nationalist and autonomist provincial party in Quebec, took power in October 2018. The name change would be in accordance with the CAQ government's policy of prioritizing culturally-fit Francophone immigrants from French-speaking countries.

History 
The ministry was founded on 5 November 1968, a decision made by then Premier Jean-Jacques Bertrand. The reasons for the creation of the ministry were: to prevent French from losing its dominant position in Quebec society as the birth rate of French Canadians fell, and to attract immigrants from the French-speaking world to Quebec. At its beginnings, the ministry opened immigration offices only in France and Italy. It also established a network of seven language orientation and training centres, whose goal was to teach French to newcomers. The department was previously overseen by the Minister of Immigration and Cultural Communities as a member of the Executive Council of Quebec.

On 20 February 1978, Canada and Quebec signed an immigration agreement giving Quebec decision-making power to choose its independent immigrants, who would then have to be approved by Ottawa.

On 5 February 1991, the Canada–Québec Accord relating to Immigration and Temporary Admission of Aliens was concluded, giving Quebec more power in the selection of immigrants by offering federal transfers of funds for integration of these, and guaranteeing Quebec an immigration rate proportional to its demographic weight in Canada.

2019 Reform

Values test and conditional residence
With the passage of Bill 9 on 16 June 2019, Quebec plans to exercise its power to persuade the Federal government to change the permanent residency in Quebec to a conditional residence permit. Quebec then plans to test the landed conditional residents on a French language test and Quebec values test. The Ministère wishes to pursue its efforts to fully exercise its powers of selection, particularly with the reintroduction of the enabling power that allows the Québec government to determine by regulation the conditions for permanent residence that the Minister can impose on the candidates selected. However, it is still unclear what Quebec plans to do with those conditional residents who fail Quebec's tests and whether they will be deported from Canada. The jurisdiction for deportation falls under the Federal government.

It remains to be seen whether the Federal government will accept this proposal by the Quebec government as this method of testing immigrants is considered to be demeaning and will compartmentalize future citizens of Canada. This move by the Quebec government is purported to cherry pick French speaking European immigrants to Quebec.Immigrants must commit to successfully carrying out the necessary steps for settling and integrating in Québec, including learning French as well as democratic values and Québec’s values, as set out in the Charter of Human Rights and Freedoms.

Cancellation of 18,000 Mon Projet CSQ Applications
With the passing of Bill 9 into law on 16 June 2019, all the pending applications in Mon Projet (approx. 18,000) were cancelled and the application fees refunded. The applicants include those who are already working in high skilled jobs in Quebec and those who are outside of Canada. The application fee will be refunded by MIDI at a later date. The applicants who still want to immigrate to Quebec are asked to apply again through the new Arrima system. The Arrima system has 95,000 applications to date, but the applicants will be selected based on selection criteria which is not publicized by MIDI. Since there are a lot of uncertainties about the selection criteria and lack of transparency, the skilled workers who are already living and working in Quebec are quitting their jobs and moving to other provinces where they can apply Express Entry and get Canadian permanent residency within 6 months as opposed to the uncertainties and 4 years of delays in Quebec. This will see a lot of high skilled temporary foreign workers and university graduates moving out of the province.

Proposed reform 
During the 2022 Quebec general election, the Coalition Avenir Québec (CAQ) government of François Legault which increased its majority ran on getting more immigration powers from Canada to the Province of Quebec. Legault has raised the idea of even having referendum on immigration powers.  

After their election win they repeated their pledge for Quebec getting more immigration powers.

Organization 
The structure of the Ministry of Immigration, Francisation and Integration is organized as follows:

 Minister of International Relations and La Francophonie
 Minister's office
 Deputy Minister — High direction
 General Secretariat
 Legal Affairs
 Communications
 Audit committee
 Internal Audit
 Assistant Deputy Minister — Planning, performance and external relations
 Administrative review
 Research, planning and business intelligence
 Ministerial coordination and external relations
 Program evaluation, quality assurance and risk management
 Assistant Deputy Minister — Development, Innovation and Organizational Support
 Innovation and Vision 3.0
 Digital transformation and information resources
 Human resources
 Administration
 Assistant Deputy Minister — Immigration and Prospecting
 Immigration operations
 Immigration and prospecting policies and programs
 Prospecting and recruitment operations abroad
 Assistant Deputy Minister — Francization and Integration
 Francization services
 Francization and integration policies and programs
 Regional Operations

Laws and regulations 
The Minister of Immigration, Francization and Integration is responsible with administering the following laws and regulations in relation to Quebec immigration:

 Act respecting the Ministère de l'Immigration, de la Diversité et de l'Inclusion (chapter M-16.1)
 Terms and conditions of the signing of certain deeds, documents and writings of the Ministère de l’Immigration et des Communautés culturelles (r. 2)
 Québec Immigration Act (chapter I-0.2.1)
 Regulation respecting immigration consultants (r. 1)
 Québec Immigration Regulation (r. 3)

Application process

Mon projet Québec 
Putting an end to the old fully paper based immigration application process, the Ministry introduced an online web application system called Mon projet Québec. The system allowed applicants to register and provide details such as education, work experience and language proficiency (both English and French) by which the immigration officers can calculate the points to select candidates based on the selection grid.

The system has since been decommissioned. All the applications in Mon Projet that were pending to be approved were cancelled and the application fees refunded. This action of the ministry has been widely criticized, and an injunction has been filed and approved by the Quebec Superior Court.

Arrima Portal 
Replacing the Mon Projet web application, a new online system based on the expression of interest rather than first-come, first-served was introduced, called Arrima.

The CAQ government wanted to reform the immigration system of Quebec with a possibility of selecting immigrants based on values test and other factors like knowledge of French. Headed by Simon Jolin-Barrette, the immigration bill (Bill 9) was passed into law as of 16 June 2019, titled An Act to increase Québec’s socio-economic prosperity and adequately meet labour market needs through successful immigrant integration.

After the passing of Bill 9, foreign skilled workers who were already present in Quebec with a validated job offer was invited to apply for a CSQ through the Arrima Portal. The immigration minister claimed that the new applications will be processed within 6 months.

Quebec Selection Certificate 
The Quebec Selection Certificate, also known as CSQ, is the certificate of selection provided to the applicants who want to immigrate to the Quebec Province of Canada. The CSQ certificate is then issued on the basis of the applicant's qualifications, work experience, language ability (French and English) and a few other factors. The candidates must then submit a permanent residence paper based application to the Federal government and wait approximately 2 years to obtain a permanent residence.

Number of certificates issued 
As of January 14, 2019, the below tables show the number of Quebec Selection Certificates issued by the Minister as per the document obtained by Access to Information.

Quebec Skilled Worker Programme

PEQ category 
The Programme de l’expérience québécoise (PEQ; 'Québec experience program') is a fast-track immigration category for skilled workers with a proven French test. Candidates are issued a CSQ within a month if they pass a French test at B2 level and either obtained a graduate degree in Quebec or a minimum of 2 years of work experience.

The Ministry announced that this category would be temporarily suspended until 1 November 2019. The basis of this decision was to give priority to skilled workers who occupy a job in Québec during this period.

Processing times 
The current processing time for applications at Sydney CIO is 21 months for the Quebec Skilled Worker program. This is in addition to the processing time for a Quebec Selection Certificate from the Quebec provincial government.

There are typically two streams of Quebec Skilled Workers: Programme de l’expérience québécoise (PEQ; 'Québec Experience Program') and Programme régulier des travailleurs qualifiés (PRTQ; 'Regular Skilled Worker'). Waiting time to obtain a Canadian permanent residency if you are a temporary foreign worker in Quebec or if you are planning to immigrate to Canada by following Quebec immigration system (PRTQ category) is currently averaging 4.6 years. For PEQ category, the average delays are 1 month for a CSQ and 21 months at the Federal level, averaging 2 years. If you are immigrating to Canada elsewhere using Express Entry, the waiting time is 6 months only.

High immigration delays 
Immigration to Quebec is a two-stage process which has uncertainties and long waiting times at both stages. The time delay to obtain a CSQ for regular skilled worker was around 2 years. Once a candidate obtain a CSQ, the federal stage process will take 2 years or more as the Quebec government has reduced the immigration levels by 20% in 2019.

So, a total waiting time of 4 years is to be expected if you are immigrating to Quebec as a regular skilled worker. This is in comparison to Express Entry system which is followed by the rest of Canada where the applicant need to wait only 4–6 months to get a permanent residency in Canada. Because of these delays and uncertainty for their future in Quebec, skilled foreign temporary workers who are already in Quebec are quitting their jobs and leaving the province to elsewhere in Canada and skilled immigrants immigrate to other provinces in Canada rather than choosing Quebec as their destination of choice.

See also
Immigration to Canada
Canada-Quebec Accord
CIC Check Processing Times
Ministère de l’Immigration, de la Diversité et de l’Inclusion

References

External links

English
Official Quebec Immigration site (English)
Obtaining a Certificat de sélection du Québec (English)
Common Values of Quebec Society (English)

French
Official Quebec Immigration site (French)
Obtaining a Certificat de sélection du Québec (French)
Common Values of Quebec (French)
Regulation respecting immigration consultants (French)

Immigration to Quebec
Immigration
Quebec
Anti-immigration politics in Canada
Migration-related organizations based in Canada